Michael Harold "Mike" Miller (born June 4, 1952) is a former vice admiral in the United States Navy, and was the first active-duty officer to direct the White House Military Office. He was the 61st Superintendent of the United States Naval Academy.

Education and early career
Miller was awarded a Bachelor of Science degree and commissioned at the United States Naval Academy in 1974. He earned his "Wings of Gold" and was designated a Naval Aviator at Pensacola in January 1976. Subsequent flying tours were primarily out of NAS Cecil Field, Florida, flying the S-3A/B Viking on deployments around the world, including combat operations against Libya, the Achille Lauro incident, and squadron command of VS-24 in the Persian Gulf during Desert Shield/Desert Storm.

Miller's shore assignments include duty as Flag Lieutenant and Aide to the Deputy Commander in Chief, U. S. Atlantic Fleet (1979), Chief Staff Officer to Sea Strike Wing One (1986), and Executive Assistant to the Commander, Naval Air Forces Pacific (1994).

Miller has served at sea as Air Operations Officer for Commander, Carrier Group 8, Executive Officer on board , and in command of the Third Fleet Flagship, . During this tour, he was responsible for a state-of-the-art technology infusion into the command ship for the eastern Pacific.

Command and flag
Following Coronado, Miller was assigned as the Operations Officer for the Seventh Fleet on board , home ported in Yokosuka, Japan. He returned to John F. Kennedy in August 1999 as her 23rd Commanding Officer, and left almost immediately for an extended deployment to the Persian Gulf. He reported for duty as the Deputy Director of the White House Military Office (WHMO) in November 2000. Miller was commissioned as a Deputy Assistant to the President and the first-ever active duty Director of the White House Military Office in November 2002.

Miller assumed command of Carrier Strike Group Seven/Ronald Reagan Strike Group on April 15, 2005.  As of 2008, he is Chief of the Navy's Office of Legislative Affairs.

Superintendent
On August 3, 2010, Miller relieved Vice Admiral Jeffrey Fowler as Superintendent of the United States Naval Academy. On July 23, 2014, Vice Admiral Walter E. Carter Jr. relieved Miller as Superintendent. Secretary of the Navy Ray Mabus presented the Navy Distinguished Service Medal as an end of tour award to Miller. During the ceremony Miller had been slated to retire, after 40 years of active naval service.

Retirement

GDMA is the subject of an ongoing federal fraud  investigation. Miller had been prevented from retiring pending the result of the investigation, and was serving as a special assistant to the Superintendent of the U.S. Naval Academy.After a thorough and complete investigation, Secretary of the Navy Ray Maybus cleared Miller of any wrongdoing. Miller later retired from the Navy at his highest achieved rank of vice admiral on August 1, 2015 after over 41 years of exemplary service.

Awards and decorations

References

External links

 United States Navy biography

United States Navy admirals
United States Naval Academy alumni
People from Minot, North Dakota
Recipients of the Legion of Merit
Recipients of the Air Medal
Living people
1952 births
Recipients of the Navy Distinguished Service Medal
Recipients of the Defense Distinguished Service Medal
Superintendents of the United States Naval Academy